Cyrus Mistry (March 11, 1956) is an Indian author and playwright. He won the 2014 DSC Prize for South Asian Literature for Chronicle of a Corpse Bearer. He is the brother of author Rohinton Mistry.

Mistry is from Mumbai. He began writing at a young age as a playwright, but has also worked as a journalist and short-story writer. His first short was published in 1979. He has also written short film scripts and several documentaries. One of his short stories, "Percy", was made into the Gujarati feature film Percy in 1989; he wrote the screenplay and dialogue. It won the National Award for Best Gujarati Film in 1989, as well as a Critics' Award at the Mannheim Film Festival.

His play Doongaji House  is "regarded as a seminal work in contemporary Indian theatre in English." His first novel was The Radiance of Ashes which was shortlisted for the Crossword Prize (2005). His second novel was Chronicle of a Corpse Bearer published in 2013, which tells the story of the Khandhias within the Parsi community who carry the bodies of the dead to the Towers of Silence where they are eaten by vultures.

Awards and honors
Sultan Padamsee Award for Doongaji House
1989 National Award for Best Gujarati Film, Percy, story, screenplay and dialogue
2005 Crossword Book Award, shortlist, The Radiance of Ashes
2014 DSC Prize for South Asian Literature, Chronicle of a Corpse Bearer
2015 Sahitya Akademi Award

Works
The Radiance of Ashes
Chronicle of a Corpse Bearer
Passion Flower: Seven Stories of Derangement
The Prospect of Miracles

References

Indian male dramatists and playwrights
Indian male novelists
Indian male journalists
1956 births
Living people
Indian male screenwriters
English-language writers from India
Writers from Mumbai
Gujarati people
20th-century Indian dramatists and playwrights
20th-century Indian male writers
Parsi people from Mumbai
Parsi writers